Ameer Saiyed (born 9 April 1996) is a Botswana cricketer. He played in four matches in the 2015 ICC World Cricket League Division Six tournament in England. He made his Twenty20 International (T20I) debut for Botswana against Namibia on 19 August 2019 during Botswana's tour of Namibia.

References

External links
 

1996 births
Living people
Botswana cricketers
Botswana Twenty20 International cricketers
Place of birth missing (living people)